Alberta Santuccio (born 22 October 1994) is an Italian right-handed épée fencer and 2021 team Olympic bronze medalist.

Early life
Santuccio was born on 22 October 1994, in Catania, Italy. She began fencing at the age of seven after witnessing her brother Giorgio play the sport.

Career
While competing with the CS Acireale, Santuccio won a gold medal in the individual event at the European Cadet Championship and in the international under 17 circuits. As such, she was chosen to be the flag bearer in 2010 Summer Youth Olympics. During the games, Santuccio won gold in the mixed team tournament and then silver in the girls' individual Épée. Santuccio also won two bronze medals at the 2014 and 2018 Fencing World Cup. In 2015, Santuccio came back from ninth place to beat Russia 40–36 in the 2015 European Games for a bronze medal.

Santuccio was selected to represent Team Italy at the 2020 Summer Olympics where she helped them win a bronze medal in the Team épée.

Medal Record

Olympic Games

World Championship

European Championship

Grand Prix

World Cup

References

External links 
 

1994 births
Living people
Italian female fencers
Fencers at the 2010 Summer Youth Olympics
Fencers at the 2015 European Games
European Games medalists in fencing
European Games bronze medalists for Italy
Olympic medalists in fencing
Olympic fencers of Italy
Medalists at the 2020 Summer Olympics
Olympic bronze medalists for Italy
Fencers at the 2020 Summer Olympics
20th-century Italian women
21st-century Italian women
World Fencing Championships medalists